Ariamnes colubrinus, known as the whip spider, is a common Australian spider belonging to the family Theridiidae. It is found in Victoria, New South Wales and Queensland.

Description
They are long and thin, often resembling a twig. Body colour varies from cream, brown or greenish. They are often being found around a metre above the ground, resembling a twig caught in a spider's web. 

The egg sac is suspended from a single strong thread. 40 to 50 yellow green eggs per sac, eggs 0.7 mm in diameter.

Hunting 
They are often found resting on one or two threads of silk, waiting with a few strands of silk acting as a snare. Once their prey hits the silk, the whip spider descends. The spider then wraps their meal in silk. It mostly eats wandering spiders, most being juveniles, as well as some insects.

References

Theridiidae
Spiders of Australia
Spiders described in 1890